The Zagreb–Rijeka railway, officially designated as the M202 railway, is a  long railway line in Croatia connecting Zagreb and Rijeka. It is part of the  Pan-European corridor V branch B, which runs from Rijeka to Budapest. It is electrified and single-tracked.

There are several short branch lines connected to the M202 railway, including the  M602 railway Škrljevo–Bakar,  M603 railway Sušak-Pećine–Brajdica area of the Port of Rijeka, and the  L214 railway between Rijeka and Brajdica — all in the area of the city of Rijeka or its immediate surroundings.

History
The line was first opened in 1865 between Zagreb and Karlovac, a branch of the Zidani most to Sisak line. The section to Rijeka was opened on 6 September 1873, and is notable for its steep descent towards the port city. Subsequently, in 1880, the line went from ownership of the Austrian Southern Railway Company to the Hungarian Government. After the First World War, the line entered ownership of the railways of the Kingdom of Serbs, Croats and Slovenes (from 1929, known as Yugoslavia). Rijeka stayed as a border station with the Ferrovie delle Stato up to 1945, when the whole line became part of the Yugoslav Railways. Since 1991, it is owned by the Croatian Railways.

Electrification
As early as 1936, the Italians electrified the Pivka-Rijeka line (not part of the current M202 railway) at the standard 3 kV DC voltage. After World War Two, the Yugoslav Railways considered the 3 kV DC electrification system to become the standard electrification system of the Yugoslav Railways, as it was already present in some parts of Croatia and Slovenia. As such, it became favoured in the 1950s and early 1960s, and electrification of the Zagreb-Rijeka line began: 
1953: Rijeka-Fužine
1960: Fužine-Moravice
1963: Moravice-Karlovac
1970: Karlovac-Zagreb GK

However, in the later half of the 1960s, the Yugoslav Railways considered the 25 kV AC at 50 Hz system instead, which later became the national standard (the project was initially experimented in Bosnia and Herzegovina between 1967 and 1969). At the same time when the electrification of the Zagreb-Rijeka line was completed, the Zagreb to Belgrade line was electrified too, at 25 kV AC. Thus, Zagreb became a multisystem station, for trains heading towards Rijeka and Ljubljana.

In the first half of the 1980s, the Yugoslav Railways considered the full conversion of the remaining 3 kV DC network (by then present in all of Slovenia and parts of West Croatia) into the national standard. Work began in 1984 and the following segments were converted:
1985: Zagreb GK-Hrvatski Leskovac (alongside with line towards Dobova, Slovenia)
1987: Hrvatski Leskovac-Moravice
2012: Moravice-Rijeka

But by 1991, the Yugoslav Railways had run out of funds, and later on, with the dissolution of Yugoslavia, the line entered ownership of the newly-created Croatian Railways. For a long while, Moravice was a multisystem station, where former JŽ Class 362 locomotives would take over trains towards Rijeka, after being pulled by former JŽ Class 441 locomotives. Along the years, various proposals for the conversion of the network were done, including conversion of the Class 1061 locomotives to Class 1161 locomotives (these were 1061s with 25 kV AC systems, rebuilt at TŽV Janko Gredelj) but eventually, the plans didn't really materialize, as Slovenia insisted on keeping the 3 kV DC electrification, and lack of funds in early 1990s Yugoslavia and Croatia led to the 1161 project to be abandoned.

Finally, in December 2012, the rest of the line, from Moravice to Rijeka (and further onwards to the border with Slovenia) was fully converted to 25 kV AC. Now all electrified lines in Croatia use 25 kV AC electrification, although in some stations the Italian-style catenary is still visible. The last Class 1061 locomotives, along with Class 315 EMUs (a variant similar to the PKP EN57 multiple units) were withdrawn.

Reconstruction of the existing and construction of the second track on the Hrvatski Leskovac – Karlovac section (2022 – 2026) 
Part of the corridor between Hrvatski Leskovac and Karlovac is currently under major reconstruction.

The project includes:

construction of the second track and reconstruction of the existing one on the entire railway line section in the length of 44,02 km (conversion of a single-track railway into a double-track)

conversion of 3 stations into stops (Horvati, Zdenčina, Draganić)

installation of a new electronic signaling and safety device, ETCS level 1 and a new traffic management infrastructure subsystem with remote control of external elements

complete overhaul of the electrification system

reconstruction of the electrical substation (EVP Mrzlo Polje and Zdenčina)

construction of three new underpasses and four new overpasses with associated roads instead of railway-road crossings

construction of new arched roads in order to abolish the existing railway-road crossings

reconstruction of some existing level railway – road crossings

construction of noise protection walls

construction of a closed drainage system

reconstruction of all existing bridges, viaducts and other structures on the section of the section.

construction of access parking lots, replacement of the old passenger platforms with new, 55-cm high ones, reconstruction of the outdoor lighting system, installation of canopies and a system of video surveillance and visual and audio notification for passengers at stop locations

construction of new 55-cm high platforms (useful length at least 160 m), underpasses, canopies, parking lots, installation of a new outdoor lighting system and a system of video surveillance and visual and audio notification for passengers at all stations along the route (Hrvatski Leskovac, Jastrebarsko and Karlovac)

Completion of the project will permit trains to maintain a target speed of 160 km/h throughout most of the rail section.

Gallery

Maps

References

External links

Railway lines in Croatia